The 37th Army Corps was an Army corps in the Imperial Russian Army.

Part of
12th Army: 1915 – 1916
1st Army: 1916 – 1917
5th Army: 1917

Reference 

Corps of the Russian Empire